The Francisco Franco National Foundation (FNFF) is a foundation and propaganda hub created in 1976 devoted to promoting the legacy of the Spanish dictator Francisco Franco. The only child of Franco, Carmen Franco (1926–2017) led the organisation and later became its honorary president.

In 2017 200,000 people signed a petition, calling on the Spanish government to ban the organisation.

In 2018, after new Prime Minister Pedro Sánchez promised that Franco's remains would be removed from the Valley of the Fallen, the Foundation collected a petition with 24,000 signatures to oppose the proposal. While relatively marginal in Spanish political culture, the FNFF (and members of the Franco family) gained enormous public visibility in connection with the dictator's exhumation.

See also 
 Francoism
 Pazo de Meirás

References

Bibliography

External links
Francisco Franco National Foundation website

Francisco Franco
Far-right politics in Spain
Foundations based in Spain
Francoism